Ebdo Mihemed (Arabic: Abdo Mohamad) is a Kurdish wedding singer from Efrin, Syria. He became popular in Finland in the autumn of 2009 due to a YouTube video which attracted over two million viewers, and reached at over four million views as of November 2018.

On the video, a Kurdish language song Pinsedî Zêde sung by Mihemed is buffalaxed into Finnish. The title of the Finnish buffalax is Niilin hanhet ("The geese of the Nile") after a phrase repeated in the refrain. Another phrase repeated in the soramimi is Pensseli-setä ("Uncle Paintbrush"), which also became Mihemed's nickname in Finland. Several other videos of Mihemed buffalaxed into Finnish have also appeared on YouTube, such as Mursuvaara ("The Walrus Danger"), Lakana ("The Sheet") and Mihemmedin Eskimolaulu ("Mihemmed's Eskimo Song"). The television production company Filmiteollisuus brought Mihemed to perform in Finland in November 2009. He appeared on the show Ne Salmiset.

On December 9, 2009, a music album of Pensseli-setä was released in Finland. He toured Finland a second time in February 2010. He has since not appeared in Finland. In 2011 and 2012, he has been the local contact for the Finnish media for reporting events in the Syrian civil war. Because of the YouTube video, Mihemed is usually referred to in Finland as "Pensseli-setä".

Face of the Syrian civil war in Finland
A national uprising started in Syria in early 2011, as a part of the events in the Arab spring. Reporter Ville Similä from Helsingin Sanomat asked in June 2011 what had happened to Mihemed in the midst of the situation which had escalated into war. Mihemed reported from Aleppo that "it is still quite peaceful here" and "most people try to live like before. In the evening people go out to smoke shishas." He also reported that people are afraid to go out at night, and the streets are full of police and soldiers. Mihemed told the reporters that he had continued working as a wedding singer despite the conflict, mostly in weddings in villages near Aleppo.

The tabloid newspaper Iltalehti asked Mihemed's friend, Al Hanan Saydo, about Mihemed in May 2012. According to Saydo, Mihemed had very little work because very few weddings are being held in the time of the civil war. Saydo also reported that considering the circumstances, Mihemed is well.

As the battles continued to Aleppo in summer 2012, Mihemed escaped from the war together with his wife and two youngest children first to Turkey, attempting to get a visa to go to Finland. When this failed, the family travelled illegally to Greece, and in spring 2013 continued to Sweden where Mihemed's wife's relatives live.

See also
 Internet phenomenon

References

Living people
Year of birth missing (living people)
Kurdish male singers
21st-century Syrian male singers
Finnish humour
Internet memes
Finland–Syria relations
Kurdish diaspora in Europe
Refugees in Sweden
Syrian emigrants to Sweden
Syrian Kurdish people
Syrian refugees